The 1977 Nicholls State Colonels football team represented Nicholls State University as a member of the Gulf South Conference (GSC) the 1977 NCAA Division II football season. Led by fourth-year head coach Bill Clements, the Colonels compiled an overall record of 4–7 with a conference mark of 2–6, placing eighth in the GSC. Nicholls State played home games at John L. Guidry Stadium in Thibodaux, Louisiana.

Schedule

References

Nicholls State
Nicholls Colonels football seasons
Nicholls State Colonels football